

Events

Pre-1600
9 – The Battle of the Teutoburg Forest ends: The Roman Empire suffers the greatest defeat of its history and the Rhine is established as the border between the Empire and the so-called barbarians for the next four hundred years.
1185 – Isaac II Angelos kills Stephen Hagiochristophorites and then appeals to the people, resulting in the revolt that deposes Andronikos I Komnenos and places Isaac on the throne of the Byzantine Empire.
1297 – Battle of Stirling Bridge: Scots jointly led by William Wallace and Andrew Moray defeat the English.
1390 – Lithuanian Civil War (1389–92): The Teutonic Knights begin a five-week siege of Vilnius.
1541 – Santiago, Chile, is attacked by indigenous warriors, led by Michimalonco, to free eight indigenous chiefs held captive by the Spaniards. 
1565 – Ottoman forces retreat from Malta ending the Great Siege of Malta.

1601–1900
1609 – Henry Hudson arrives on Manhattan Island and meets the indigenous people living there.
1649 – Siege of Drogheda ends: Oliver Cromwell's Parliamentarian troops take the town and execute its garrison.
1683 – Battle of Vienna: Coalition forces, including the famous winged Hussars, led by Polish King John III Sobieski lift the siege laid by Ottoman forces.
1697 – Battle of Zenta: a major engagement in the Great Turkish War (1683–1699) and one of the most decisive defeats in Ottoman history.
1708 – Charles XII of Sweden stops his march to conquer Moscow outside Smolensk, marking the turning point in the Great Northern War. The army is defeated nine months later in the Battle of Poltava, and the Swedish Empire ceases to be a major power.
1709 – Battle of Malplaquet: Great Britain, Netherlands, and Austria fight against France.
1714 – Siege of Barcelona: Barcelona, capital city of Catalonia, surrenders to Spanish and French Bourbon armies in the War of the Spanish Succession.
1758 – Battle of Saint Cast: France repels British invasion during the Seven Years' War.
1775 – Benedict Arnold's expedition to Quebec leaves Cambridge, Massachusetts.
1776 – British–American peace conference on Staten Island fails to stop nascent American Revolutionary War.
1777 – American Revolutionary War: Battle of Brandywine: The British celebrate a major victory in Chester County, Pennsylvania.
1780 – American Revolutionary War: Sugarloaf massacre: A small detachment of militia from Northampton County, Pennsylvania, are attacked by Native Americans and Loyalists near Little Nescopeck Creek.
1786 – The beginning of the Annapolis Convention.
1789 – Alexander Hamilton is appointed the first United States Secretary of the Treasury.
1792 – The Hope Diamond is stolen along with other French crown jewels when six men break into the house where they are stored.
1800 – The Maltese National Congress Battalions are disbanded by British Civil Commissioner Alexander Ball.
1802 – France annexes the Kingdom of Piedmont.
1803 – Battle of Delhi, during the Second Anglo-Maratha War, between British troops under General Lake, and Marathas of Scindia's army under General Louis Bourquin.
1813 – War of 1812: British troops arrive in Mount Vernon and prepare to march to and invade Washington, D.C.
1814 – War of 1812: The climax of the Battle of Plattsburgh, a major United States victory in the war.
1826 – Captain William Morgan, an ex-freemason is arrested in Batavia, New York for debt after declaring that he would publish The Mysteries of Free Masonry, a book against Freemasonry. This sets into motion the events that led to his mysterious disappearance.
1829 – An expedition led by Isidro Barradas at Tampico, sent by the Spanish crown to retake Mexico, surrenders at the Battle of Tampico, marking the effective end of Mexico's campaign for independence.
1830 – Anti-Masonic Party convention; one of the first American political party conventions.
1836 – The Riograndense Republic is proclaimed by rebels after defeating Empire of Brazil's troops in the Battle of Seival, during the Ragamuffin War.
1851 – Christiana Resistance: Escaped slaves led by William Parker fight off and kill a slave owner who, with a federal marshal and an armed party, sought to seize three of his former slaves in Christiana, Pennsylvania, thereby creating a cause célèbre between slavery proponents and abolitionists.
1852 – Outbreak of Revolution of September 11 resulting in the State of Buenos Aires declaring independence as a Republic.
1857 – The Mountain Meadows massacre: Mormon settlers and Paiutes massacre 120 pioneers at Mountain Meadows, Utah.
1881 – In the Swiss state of Glarus, a rockslide buries parts of the village of Elm, destroying 83 buildings and killing 115 people.
1897 – After months of pursuit, generals of Menelik II of Ethiopia capture Gaki Sherocho, the last king of the Kaffa.

1901–present
1903 – The first race at the Milwaukee Mile in West Allis, Wisconsin is held. It is the oldest major speedway in the world.
1905 – The Ninth Avenue derailment occurs in New York City, killing 13.
1914 – World War I: Australia invades German New Guinea, defeating a German contingent at the Battle of Bita Paka.
  1914   – The Second Period of Russification: The teaching of the Russian language and Russian history in Finnish schools is ordered to be considerably increased as part of the forced Russification program in Finland run by Tsar Nicholas II.
1916 – The Quebec Bridge's central span collapses, killing 11 men. The bridge previously collapsed completely on August 29, 1907.
1919 – United States Marine Corps invades Honduras.
1921 – Nahalal, the first moshav in Palestine, is settled as part of a Zionist plan of creating a Jewish state, later to be Israel.
1922 – The Treaty of Kars is ratified in Yerevan, Armenia.
1941 – Construction begins on The Pentagon.
1941 – Charles Lindbergh's Des Moines Speech accusing the British, Jews and FDR's administration of pressing for war with Germany.
1943 – World War II: German troops occupy Corsica and Kosovo-Metohija ending the Italian occupation of Corsica.
  1944   – World War II: RAF bombing raid on Darmstadt and the following firestorm kill 11,500.
1945 – World War II: Australian 9th Division forces liberate the Japanese-run Batu Lintang camp, a POW and civilian internment camp on the island of Borneo.
1954 – Hurricane Edna hits New England (United States) as a Category 2 hurricane, causing significant damage and 29 deaths.
1961 – Hurricane Carla strikes the Texas coast as a Category 4 hurricane, the second strongest storm ever to hit the state.
1965 – Indo-Pakistani War: The Indian Army captures the town of Burki, just southeast of Lahore.
1967 – China's People's Liberation Army (PLA) launched an attack on Indian posts at Nathu La, Sikkim, India, which resulted in military clashes.
1968 – Air France Flight 1611 crashes off Nice, France, killing 89 passengers and six crew.
1970 – The Dawson's Field hijackers release 88 of their hostages. The remaining hostages, mostly Jews and Israeli citizens, are held until September 25.
1971 – The Egyptian Constitution becomes official.
1972 – The San Francisco Bay Area Rapid Transit system begins passenger service.
1973 – A coup in Chile, headed by General Augusto Pinochet, topples the democratically elected president Salvador Allende. Pinochet exercises dictatorial power until ousted in a referendum in 1988, staying in power until 1990.
  1973   – JAT Airways Flight 769 crashes into the Maganik mountain range while on approach to Titograd Airport, killing 35 passengers and six crew.
1974 – Eastern Air Lines Flight 212 crashes in Charlotte, North Carolina, killing 69 passengers and two crew.
1976 – A bomb planted by a Croatian terrorist, Zvonko Bušić, is found at New York's Grand Central Terminal; one NYPD officer is killed trying to defuse it.
1980 – A new constitution of Chile is established under the influence of then Chilean dictator Augusto Pinochet, which is subject to controversy in Chile today.
1982 – The international forces that were guaranteeing the safety of Palestinian refugees following Israel's 1982 Invasion of Lebanon leave Beirut. Five days later, several thousand refugees are massacred in the Sabra and Shatila refugee camps by Phalange forces.
1989 – Hungary announces that the East German refugees who had been housed in temporary camps were free to leave for West Germany.
1990 – A Faucett Boeing 727 disappears in the Atlantic Ocean while being flown from Malta to Peru.
1991 – Continental Express Flight 2574 crashes in Colorado County, Texas, near Eagle Lake, killing 11 passengers and three crew.
1992 – Hurricane Iniki, one of the most damaging hurricanes in United States history, devastates the Hawaiian Islands of Kauai and Oahu.
1997 – NASA's Mars Global Surveyor reaches Mars.
  1997   – Kurkse tragedy: Fourteen Estonian soldiers of the Baltic Battalion are drowned or die of hypothermia during a training exercise in the Kurkse Strait.
  1997   – After a nationwide referendum, Scotland votes to establish a devolved parliament within the United Kingdom.
2001 – The September 11 attacks, a series of coordinated terrorist attacks killing 2,996 people using four aircraft hijacked by 19 members of al-Qaeda. Two aircraft crash into the World Trade Center in New York City, a third crashes into The Pentagon in Arlington County, Virginia, and a fourth into a field near Shanksville, Pennsylvania.
2007 – Russia tests the largest conventional weapon ever, the Father of All Bombs.
2008 – A major Channel Tunnel fire breaks out on a freight train, resulting in the closure of part of the tunnel for six months.
2011 – A dedication ceremony is held at the United States National September 11 Memorial on the 10th anniversary of the September 11 attacks in New York City, and the memorial opens to family members.
2012 – A total of 315 people are killed in two garment factory fires in Pakistan.
  2012   – The U.S. embassy in Benghazi, Libya is attacked, resulting in four deaths.
2015 – A crane collapses onto the Masjid al-Haram mosque in Saudi Arabia, killing 111 people and injuring 394 others.

Births

Pre-1600
 600 – Yuknoom Ch'een II, Mayan ruler
1182 – Minamoto no Yoriie, Japanese shōgun (d. 1204)
1318 – Eleanor of Lancaster, countess of Arundel (d. 1372)
1465 – Bernardo Accolti, Italian poet (d. 1536)
1476 – Louise of Savoy, French regent (d. 1531)
1494 – Elisabeth of Brunswick-Lüneburg, Duchess of Guelders (1518–1538) (d. 1572)
1522 – Ulisse Aldrovandi, Italian ornithologist and botanist (d. 1605)
1524 – Pierre de Ronsard, French poet and author (d. 1585)
1525 – John George, Elector of Brandenburg (d. 1598)
1557 – Joseph Calasanz, Spanish priest and founder of Piarists (d. 1648)
1572 – Daniyal, Imperial Prince of the Royal House of Timur (d. 1604)
1578 – Vincenzo Maculani, Catholic cardinal (d. 1667)

1601–1900
1611 – Henri de la Tour d'Auvergne, Vicomte de Turenne, French general (d. 1675)
1681 – Johann Gottlieb Heineccius, German academic and jurist (d. 1741)
1700 – James Thomson, Scottish poet and playwright (d. 1748)
1711 – William Boyce, English organist and composer (d. 1779)
1723 – Johann Bernhard Basedow, German author and educator (d. 1790)
1751 – Princess Charlotte of Saxe-Meiningen (d. 1827)
1764 – Valentino Fioravanti, Italian organist and composer (d. 1837)
1771 – Mungo Park, Scottish surgeon and explorer (d. 1806)
1786 – Friedrich Kuhlau, German-Danish pianist and composer (d. 1832)
1798 – Franz Ernst Neumann, German mineralogist and physicist (d. 1895)
1800 – Daniel S. Dickinson, American lawyer and politician, 13th Lieutenant Governor of New York (d. 1866)
1816 – Carl Zeiss, German lens maker, created the Optical instrument (d. 1888)
1825 – Eduard Hanslick, Bohemian-Austrian musicologist and critic (d. 1904)
1829 – Thomas Hill, American painter (d. 1908)
1836 – Fitz Hugh Ludlow, American journalist, author, and explorer (d. 1870)
1838 – John Ireland, Irish-American archbishop (d. 1918)
1847 – Mary Watson Whitney, American astronomer and academic (d. 1921)
1859 – Vjenceslav Novak, Croatian author and playwright (d. 1905)
1860 – James Allan, New Zealand rugby player (d. 1934)
1861 – Juhani Aho, Finnish author and journalist (d. 1921)
1862 – Julian Byng, 1st Viscount Byng of Vimy, English field marshal and politician, 12th Governor General of Canada (d. 1935)
  1862   – Hawley Harvey Crippen, American physician (d. 1910)
  1862   – O. Henry, American short story writer (d. 1910)
1865 – Rainis, Latvian poet and playwright (d. 1929)
1871 – Scipione Borghese, 10th Prince of Sulmona, Italian racing driver, mountaineer, and politician (d. 1927)
1876 – Stan Rowley, Australian sprinter (d. 1924)
1877 – Felix Dzerzhinsky, Polish-Russian academic and politician (d. 1926)
  1877   – James Hopwood Jeans, English physicist, astronomer, and mathematician (d. 1946)
1879 – Louis Coatalen, French engineer (d. 1962)
1884 – Sudhamoy Pramanick, Indian activist and politician (d. 1974)
1885 – D. H. Lawrence, English novelist, poet, playwright, and critic (d. 1930)
  1885   – Herbert Stothart, American composer and conductor (d. 1949)
1891 – William Thomas Walsh, American historian, author, and educator (d. 1949)
1893 – Douglas Hawkes, English-Greek racing driver and engineer (d. 1974)
1895 – Vinoba Bhave, Indian philosopher and Gandhian, Bharat Ratna Awardee (d. 1982)
1898 – Gerald Templer, English field marshal and politician, British High Commissioner in Malaya (d. 1979)
1899 – Philipp Bouhler, German politician (d. 1945)
  1899   – Jimmie Davis, American singer-songwriter and politician, 47th Governor of Louisiana (d. 2000)
  1899   – Anton Koolmann, Estonian wrestler and coach (d. 1953)

1901–present
1901 – D. W. Brooks, American farmer and businessman, founded Gold Kist (d. 1999)
1903 – Theodor Adorno, German sociologist and philosopher (d. 1969)
  1903   – Stephen Etnier, American lieutenant and painter (d. 1984)
1904 – Karl Plutus, Estonian lawyer and jurist (d. 2010)
1907 – Lev Oborin, Russian pianist and educator (d. 1974)
1908 – Alvar Lidell, English journalist (d. 1981)
1911 – Lala Amarnath, Indian cricketer (d. 2000)
  1911   – Bola de Nieve, Cuban singer-songwriter and pianist (d. 1971)
1913 – Bear Bryant, American football player and coach (d. 1983)
  1913   – Jacinto Convit, Venezuelan physician and academic (d. 2014)
1914 – Serbian Patriarch Pavle II (d. 2009)
1915 – Dajikaka Gadgil, Indian jeweller (d. 2014)
1916 – Ed Sabol, American film producer, co-founded NFL Films (d. 2015)
1917 – Donald Blakeslee, American colonel and pilot (d. 2008)
  1917   – Herbert Lom, Czech-born English actor (d. 2012)
  1917   – Ferdinand Marcos, Filipino soldier, lawyer, and politician, 10th President of the Philippines (d. 1989)
  1917   – Jessica Mitford, English-American journalist and author (d. 1996)
  1917   – Daniel Wildenstein, French art dealer and horse breeder (d. 2001)
1921 – Leaford Bearskin, American tribal leader and colonel (d. 2012)
1923 – Betsy Drake, American actress (d. 2015)
  1923   – Vasilije Mokranjac, Serbian composer and academic (d. 1984)
1924 – Daniel Akaka, American soldier, engineer, and politician (d. 2018)
  1924   – Tom Landry, American football player and coach (d. 2000)
  1924   – Rudolf Vrba, Czech-Canadian pharmacologist and educator (d. 2006)
1925 – Harry Somers, Canadian soldier and composer (d. 1999)
1926 – Eddie Miksis, American baseball player (d. 2005)
1927 – Keith Holman, Australian rugby league player and coach (d. 2011)
  1927   – G. David Schine, American soldier and businessman (d. 1996)
1928 – Reubin Askew, American sergeant, lawyer, and politician, 37th Governor of Florida (d. 2014)
  1928   – Earl Holliman, American actor
1929 – Luis García, Venezuelan baseball player and manager (d. 2014)
  1929   – Primož Kozak, Slovenian playwright (d. 1981)
  1929   – Patrick Mayhew, English lawyer and politician, Secretary of State for Northern Ireland (d. 2016)
1930 – Cathryn Damon, American actress and dancer (d. 1987)
  1930   – Jean-Claude Forest, French author and illustrator (d. 1998)
  1930   – Saleh Selim, Egyptian footballer, manager, and actor (d. 2002)
1931 – Hans-Ulrich Wehler, German historian and academic (d. 2014)
1933 – Margaret Booth, English lawyer and judge (d. 2021)
  1933   – William Luther Pierce, American author and activist (d. 2002)
  1933   – Nicola Pietrangeli, Italian tennis player
1934 – Oliver Jones, Canadian pianist and composer
1935 – Arvo Pärt, Estonian composer
  1935   – Gherman Titov, Russian general, pilot, and astronaut (d. 2000)
1936 – Pavel Landovský, Czech actor, director, and playwright (d. 2014)
1937 – Robert Crippen, American captain, pilot, and astronaut
  1937   – Queen Paola of Belgium
1938 – David Higgins, English composer and conductor (d. 2006)
  1938   – Brian F. G. Johnson, English chemist and academic
1939 – Charles Geschke, American businessman, co-founded Adobe Systems (d. 2021)
1940 – Brian De Palma, American director, producer, and screenwriter
  1940   – Nông Đức Mạnh, Vietnamese politician
1941 – Minnijean Brown-Trickey, Civil Rights activist and Little Rock Nine member
1942 – Lola Falana, American actress, singer, and dancer
1943 – André Caillé, Canadian chemist and businessman
  1943   – Brian Perkins, New Zealand-English journalist and actor
1944 – Everaldo, Brazilian footballer (d. 1974)
  1944   – Freddy Thielemans, Belgian educator and politician, Mayor of Brussels
1945 – Franz Beckenbauer, German footballer and manager
  1945   – Gianluigi Gelmetti, Italian composer and conductor (d. 2021)
  1945   – Leo Kottke, American singer-songwriter and guitarist
1946 – Dennis Tufano, American rock singer
1948 – John Martyn, English-Scottish singer-songwriter and guitarist (d. 2009)
1949 – Roger Uttley, English rugby player and coach
  1949   – Bill Whittington, American racing driver
1950 – Anne Dell, Australian biochemist and academic
  1950   – Bruce Doull, Australian footballer
  1950   – Amy Madigan, American actress 
  1950   – Barry Sheene, English motorcycle racer and sportscaster (d. 2003)
1951 – Miroslav Dvořák, Czech ice hockey player (d. 2008)
  1951   – Richard D. Gill, English-Dutch mathematician and academic
  1951   – Hugo Porta, Argentinian rugby player
1952 – Catherine Bott, English soprano
1953 – Jani Allan, English-South African journalist and author
  1953   – Sarita Francis, Former Montserrat Deputy Governor 
  1953   – Renée Geyer, Australian singer-songwriter
  1953   – Tommy Shaw, American singer-songwriter and guitarist 
1955 – Sharon Lamb, American psychologist and academic
1956 – Tony Gilroy, American director, producer, and screenwriter
1959 – Andre Dubus III, American novelist and short story writer
  1959   – David Frost, South African golfer
1960 – Hiroshi Amano, Japanese physicist and academic, Nobel Prize laureate
  1960   – Michael P. Leavitt, American soldier
1961 – Philip Ardagh, English author
  1961   – Virginia Madsen, American actress
  1961   – Samina Raja, Pakistani poet and educator (d. 2012)
1962 – Filip Dewinter, Belgian politician
  1962   – Kristy McNichol, American actress
  1962   – Victoria Poleva, Ukrainian pianist and composer
  1962   – Julio Salinas, Spanish footballer
  1962   – Jenny Sanford, American banker and businesswoman
1963 – Dave Bidini, Canadian singer-songwriter and guitarist 
1965 – Bashar al-Assad, Syrian politician, 21st President of Syria
  1965   – Paul Heyman, American wrestling promoter, manager, and journalist
  1965   – Moby, American singer-songwriter, musician, and DJ
1967 – Maria Bartiromo, American financial journalist and television personality
  1967   – Harry Connick Jr., American singer-songwriter, pianist, actor, and talk show host
  1967   – Sung Jae-gi, South Korean activist, founded Man of Korea (d. 2013)
  1967   – Charles Walker, English politician
1968 – Allan Alaküla, Estonian journalist
  1968   – Paul Mayeda Berges, American director and screenwriter
1969 – Stefano Cagol, Italian artist, photographer and director
  1969   – Eduardo Pérez, American baseball player, manager, and sportscaster
1970 – Antonio Gómez Medina, Mexican wrestler 
  1970   – Taraji P. Henson, American actress and singer 
1971 – Richard Ashcroft, English singer-songwriter and musician 
1974 – DeLisha Milton-Jones, American basketball player and coach
1975 – Juan Cobián, Argentinian footballer
  1975   – Pierre Issa, South African footballer
1976 – Tomáš Enge, Czech racing driver
  1976   – Murali Kartik, Indian cricketer
1977 – Ludacris, American rapper and producer
  1977   – Matthew Stevens, Welsh snooker player
  1977   – Tobias Zellner, German footballer
1978 – Ben Lee, Australian singer-songwriter, guitarist, and actor 
  1978   – Ed Reed, American football player
  1978   – Dejan Stanković, Serbian footballer and manager
1979 – Eric Abidal, French footballer
  1979   – Frank Francisco, Dominican baseball player
  1979   – David Pizarro, Chilean footballer
1980 – Mike Comrie, Canadian ice hockey player
  1980   – Antônio Pizzonia, Brazilian racing driver
1981 – Andrea Dossena, Italian footballer
  1981   – Dylan Klebold, American mass murderer, responsible for the Columbine High School massacre (d. 1999)
1982 – Elvan Abeylegesse, Ethiopian-Turkish runner
  1982   – Yelena Parkhomenko, Azerbaijani volleyball player
1983 – Vivian Cheruiyot, Kenyan runner
  1983   – Ike Diogu, American basketball player
  1983   – Jacoby Ellsbury, American baseball player
1984 – Aled de Malmanche, New Zealand rugby player
  1984   – Benson Stanley, New Zealand rugby player
1985 – Shaun Livingston, American basketball player
  1985   – Zack Stortini, Canadian ice hockey player
1986 – Chiliboy Ralepelle, South African rugby player
1987 – Robert Acquafresca, Italian footballer
  1987   – Tyler Hoechlin, American actor
1988 – Mike Moustakas, American baseball player
1990 – Jo Inge Berget, Norwegian footballer
  1990   – Jarrod Croker, Australian rugby league player
1991 – Jordan Ayew, Ghanaian footballer
  1991   – Rhema Obed, English footballer
  1991   – Kygo, Norwegian DJ
1992 – Jonathan Adams, English discus thrower
1993 – Farrah Moan, American drag queen and entertainer
1997 – Harmony Tan, French tennis player

Deaths

Pre-1600
 883 – Kesta Styppiotes, Byzantine general
1063 – Béla I of Hungary (b. 1016)
1161 – Melisende, Queen of Jerusalem (b. 1105)
1185 – Stephen Hagiochristophorites, Byzantine courtier (b. 1130)
1279 – Robert Kilwardby, English cardinal (b. 1215)
1297 – Hugh de Cressingham, English Treasurer
1298 – Philip of Artois, Lord of Conches, Nonancourt, and Domfront (b. 1269)
1349 – Bonne of Luxembourg, queen of John II of France (b. 1315)
1569 – Vincenza Armani, Italian actress (b. 1530)
1599 – Beatrice Cenci, Italian noblewoman (b. 1577)

1601–1900
1677 – James Harrington, English philosopher and author (b. 1611)
1680 – Emperor Go-Mizunoo of Japan (b. 1596)
1721 – Rudolf Jakob Camerarius, German botanist and physician (b. 1665)
1733 – François Couperin, French organist and composer (b. 1668)
1760 – Louis Godin, French astronomer and academic (b. 1704)
1823 – David Ricardo, English economist and politician (b. 1772)
1843 – Joseph Nicollet, French mathematician and explorer (b. 1786)
1865 – Christophe Léon Louis Juchault de Lamoricière, French general (b. 1806)
1888 – Domingo Faustino Sarmiento, Argentinian journalist and politician, 7th President of Argentina (b. 1811)
1896 – Francis James Child, American scholar and educator (b. 1825)

1901–present
1911 – Louis Henri Boussenard, French explorer and author (b. 1847)
1915 – William Sprague IV, American businessman and politician, 27th Governor of Rhode Island (b. 1830)
1917 – Georges Guynemer, French captain and pilot (b. 1894)
1919 – Quianu Robinson, New Mexican Congressman and political ally of Conrad Hilton (b. 1852)
1921 – Subramania Bharati, Indian journalist, poet, and activist (b. 1882)
1926 – Matsunosuke Onoe, Japanese actor and director (b. 1875)
1932 – Stanisław Wigura, Polish pilot and businessman, co-founded the RWD Company (b. 1901)
  1932   – Franciszek Żwirko, Polish soldier and pilot (b. 1895)
1935 – Charles Norris, American coroner (b. 1867)
1939 – Konstantin Korovin, Russian-French painter and set designer (b. 1861)
1941 – Christian Rakovsky, Bulgarian physician, journalist, and politician, Soviet Ambassador to France (b. 1873)
1948 – Muhammad Ali Jinnah, Pakistani lawyer and politician, 1st Governor-General of Pakistan (b. 1876)
1949 – Henri Rabaud, French composer and conductor (b. 1873)
1950 – Jan Smuts, South African field marshal and politician, 2nd Prime Minister of South Africa (b. 1870)
1952 – Alfrēds Riekstiņš, Latvian military officer and freedom fighter (d. 1913)
1956 – Billy Bishop, Canadian colonel and pilot (b. 1894)
1957 – Mary Proctor, American astronomer (b. 1862)
1958 – Camillien Houde, Canadian politician, 34th Mayor of Montreal (b. 1889)
  1958   – Robert W. Service, English-French poet and author (b. 1874)
1959 – Paul Douglas, American actor (b. 1907)
1964 – Gajanan Madhav Muktibodh, Indian poet and critic (b. 1917)
1965 – Ralph C. Smedley, American educator, founded Toastmasters International (b. 1878)
1966 – Collett E. Woolman, American businessman, co-founded Delta Air Lines (b. 1889)
1967 – Tadeusz Żyliński, Polish engineer and academic (b. 1904)
1968 – René Cogny, French general (b. 1904)
1971 – Nikita Khrushchev, Russian general and politician (b. 1894)
1973 – Salvador Allende, Chilean physician and politician, 29th President of Chile (b. 1908)
  1973   – Neem Karoli Baba, Indian philosopher and guru
1974 – Lois Lenski, American author and illustrator (b. 1893)
1978 – Mike Gazella, American baseball player and manager (b. 1895)
  1978   – Georgi Markov, Bulgarian author and playwright (b. 1929)
  1978   – Janet Parker, English photographer (b. 1938)
  1978   – Ronnie Peterson, Swedish racing driver (b. 1944)
1982 – Albert Soboul, French historian and academic (b. 1914)
1984 – Jerry Voorhis, American politician (b. 1901)
1985 – William Alwyn, English composer, conductor, and educator (b. 1905)
  1985   – Henrietta Barnett, British Women's Royal Air Force officer (b. 1905)
  1985   – Eleanor Dark, Australian author (b. 1901)
1986 – Panagiotis Kanellopoulos, Greek academic and politician, 138th Prime Minister of Greece (b. 1902)
  1986   – Noel Streatfeild, English author (b. 1895)
1987 – Lorne Greene, Canadian actor (b. 1915)
  1987   – Peter Tosh, Jamaican singer-songwriter and guitarist (b. 1944)
  1987   – Mahadevi Varma, Indian poet and educator (b. 1907)
1988 – Roger Hargreaves, English author and illustrator (b. 1935)
1990 – Myrna Mack, Guatemalan anthropologist and activist (b. 1949)
1991 – Ernst Herbeck, Austrian-German poet (b. 1920)
1993 – Antoine Izméry, Haitian businessman and activist
  1993   – Erich Leinsdorf, Austrian-American conductor (b. 1912)
  1993   – Mary Jane Reoch, American cyclist (b. 1945)
1994 – Luciano Sgrizzi, Italian harpsichordist, pianist, and composer (b. 1910)
  1994   – Jessica Tandy, English-American actress (b. 1909)
1995 – Anita Harding, English neurologist and academic (b. 1952)
1997 – Camille Henry, Canadian ice hockey player and coach (b. 1933)
  1997   – Hannah Weiner, American poet (b. 1928)
1998 – Dane Clark, American actor (b. 1912)
1999 – Belkis Ayón, Cuban painter and lithographer (b. 1967)
  1999   – Gonzalo Rodríguez, Uruguayan racing driver (b. 1972)
2001 – Alice Stewart Trillin, American author and educator (b. 1938)
  2001   – Casualties of the September 11 attacks: see Category:Victims of the September 11 attacks
2002 – Kim Hunter, American actress (b. 1922) 
  2002   – Johnny Unitas, American football player and sportscaster (b. 1933)
  2002   – David Wisniewski, American author and illustrator (b. 1953)
2003 – Anna Lindh, Swedish politician, 39th Minister of Foreign Affairs for Sweden (b. 1957)
  2003   – John Ritter, American actor (b. 1948)
2004 – Fred Ebb, American songwriter (b. 1928)
  2004   – David Mann, American painter and illustrator (b. 1939)
  2004   – Patriarch Peter VII of Alexandria (b. 1949)
2006 – William Auld, Scottish poet and author (b. 1924)
  2006   – Joachim Fest, German journalist and author (b. 1926)
2007 – Ian Porterfield, Scottish footballer and manager (b. 1946)
  2007   – Gene Savoy, American explorer, theologian, and author (b. 1927)
  2007   – Jean Séguy, French sociologist and author (b. 1925)
  2007   – Joe Zawinul, Austrian keyboard player and songwriter (b. 1932)
2009 – Jim Carroll, American author, poet and musician (b. 1949)
  2009   – Pierre Cossette, Canadian producer and manager (b. 1923)
  2009   – Larry Gelbart, American director, producer, and screenwriter (b. 1928)
  2009   – Yoshito Usui, Japanese author and illustrator (b. 1958)
2010 – Harold Gould, American actor (b. 1923)
  2010   – Kevin McCarthy, American actor (b. 1914)
2011 – Christian Bakkerud, Danish racing driver (b. 1984)
  2011   – Ralph Gubbins, English footballer (b. 1932)
  2011   – Anjali Gupta, Indian soldier and pilot (b. 1975)
  2011   – Andy Whitfield, Welsh actor and model (b. 1971)
2012 – Finn Bergesen, Norwegian civil servant and businessman (b. 1945)
  2012   – Tomas Evjen, Norwegian cinematographer and producer (b. 1972)
  2012   – J. Christopher Stevens, American lawyer and diplomat, 10th United States Ambassador to Libya (b. 1960)
2013 – Francisco Chavez, Filipino lawyer and politician, Solicitor General of the Philippines (b. 1947)
  2013   – Albert Jacquard, French geneticist and biologist (b. 1925)
  2013   – Andrzej Trybulec, Polish mathematician and computer scientist (b. 1941)
2014 – Bob Crewe, American singer-songwriter and producer (b. 1930)
  2014   – Antoine Duhamel, French composer and conductor (b. 1925)
  2014   – Donald Sinden, English actor (b. 1923)
2016 – Alexis Arquette, American actress, musician and cabaret performer (b. 1969)
2019 – B. J. Habibie, 3rd President of Indonesia (b. 1936)
2020 – Toots Hibbert, Jamaican singer and songwriter (b. 1942)
2022 – Javier Marías, Spanish novelist, journalist and translator (b. 1951)
  2022   – John W. O'Malley, American academic, Catholic historian, and Jesuit priest (b. 1927)
  2022   – Joyce Reynolds, British classicist and academic (b. 1918)

Holidays and observances
Battle of Tendra Day (Russia)
Christian feast days:
Blessed Francesco Bonifacio
Deiniol
Felix, Regula, and Exuperantius
Harry Burleigh (Episcopal Church)
John Gabriel Perboyre (one of Martyr Saints of China)
Leudinus (Bobo)
Our Lady of Coromoto
Paphnutius of Thebes (Roman Catholic Church)
Patiens of Lyon
Protus and Hyacinth
Sperandia
Theodora of Alexandria
September 11 (Eastern Orthodox liturgics)
Death Anniversary of Quaid-e-Azam Muhammad Ali Jinnah (Pakistan)
Emergency Number Day (United States) 
Enkutatash falls on this day if it is not a leap year. Celebrated on the first day of Mäskäräm. (Ethiopia, Eritrea, Rastafari)
National Day (Catalonia)
Nayrouz (Coptic Orthodox Church), September 12 on leap years. 
September 11 attacks-related observances (United States):
National Day of Service and Remembrance 
Patriot Day 
Teachers' Day (Argentina)

References

External links

 
 
 

Days of the year
September